Chuck Merriman （1933-2021）is an American Karate Practitioner, Instructor and Coach.

Early life
Chuck Merriman was born in Waterford, Connecticut on January 8, 1933.    Died October 18, 2021 in Glendale Arizona.

Career
Chuck Merriman has studied under Peter Urban, Chris DeBaise, Korean judo master In Soo H'Wang, Nakabayashi Sadaki, Miyazato Eiichi (10th dan - senior student of Chojun Miyagi), and Iha Koshin (10th Dan).

Chuck Merriman has served as Head Coach of the AAU National Karate Team and is a member of the AAU National Karate Coaches Committee. He is also a member of the AAU National Karate Program Technical Committee and has acted as Chief Arbitrator for AAU Region One Karate and for the AAU National Karate Championships. Merriman has been instrumental in popularizing karate and Goju-Ryu karate throughout the western world.

In 1995 Merriman was appointed Head Coach for the United States National Karate Team for the Olympic Sanctioned XII Pan American Games in Buenos Aires, Argentina. This was the first time that karate had been included in the Pan American Games. Merriman was also appointed coach for the United States National Team for P.U.K.O. Championships in Medellín, Colombia.

In 1970 Merriman founded Karate International, teaching Goju-Ryu karate to students in the United States.

Qualifications
Merriman holds the ranks of Judan (10th Dan) Hanshi Okinawan Goju Ryu Karate Do/ Jundokan, Okinawa;Sandan (3rd Dan) Kodokan Judo; and Shodan (1st Dan) Hakkoryu jujutsu.

References

American male karateka
Living people
Karate coaches
Year of birth missing (living people)
Gōjū-ryū practitioners